"Mayberry" is a song written by Arlos Smith and recorded by American country music group Rascal Flatts.  It was released in December 2003 as the fourth and final single from the band’s 2002  album Melt. The song became the group’s second  number one hit on the U.S. Billboard Hot Country Singles & Tracks chart. It also peaked at number 21 on the U.S. Billboard Hot 100, thus becoming a crossover hit.

Background
Gary LeVox said of the song, "The banjo really stands out on this track. It tells a lot about life in 2002, how busy you can get being caught up in the rat race. It reminds me of my childhood and it’s a really cool tune--one of our favorites."

Content
The song references the easy-going life lived in the fictional town of Mayberry, from The Andy Griffith Show. It depicts the way life used to be, before the world started changing and becoming so fast-paced. The song is set in the key of G-flat major albeit every following verse modulates to the key of A major.

Chart performance
"Mayberry" debuted at number 56 on the U.S. Billboard Hot Country Singles & Tracks for the week of January 3, 2004. On the week of May 22, 2004, "Mayberry" became the group's second number one hit.

Year-end charts

References

2003 singles
Rascal Flatts songs
Song recordings produced by Mark Bright (record producer)
Lyric Street Records singles
2002 songs
The Andy Griffith Show
Songs about nostalgia